Richard Vary Kirkman Finlay (12 May 1883 – 17 February 1948) was a Scottish amateur football inside forward who played in the Scottish League for Queen's Park.

Personal life 
Finlay served as a lieutenant in the Royal Naval Volunteer Reserve during the First World War.

Career statistics

References

1883 births
Scottish footballers
Scottish Football League players
Royal Naval Volunteer Reserve personnel of World War I
Association football inside forwards
Queen's Park F.C. players
People from Helensburgh
1948 deaths
Royal Navy officers of World War I
Sportspeople from Argyll and Bute